Kathleen Matthews-Ward is an Australian politician who is the current member for the district of Broadmeadows in the Victorian Legislative Assembly. She is a member of the Labor Party and was elected in the 2022 state election, after replacing retiring MLA Frank McGuire.

Prior to entering parliament, she had worked in retail, hospitality, finance, advocacy and aged care, she had volunteered with many sports clubs, schools, kinders and local organisations, and served as a councillor on Moreland City Council from 2004–2012.

References 

Year of birth missing (living people)
Living people
Members of the Victorian Legislative Assembly
21st-century Australian politicians
21st-century Australian women politicians
Australian Labor Party members of the Parliament of Victoria
Women members of the Victorian Legislative Assembly